Neugattersleben is a village and a former municipality in the district Salzlandkreis, in Saxony-Anhalt, Germany. Since 1 January 2010, it is part of the town Nienburg.

Neugattersleben Castle was owned by the House of Alvensleben from 1573 until its expropriation in 1945 by communist East Germany.

Notable people
 
 
Gebhard XXV. von Alvensleben (1618-1681), German politician and historian
 Werner von Alvensleben (1875-1947), German businessman and politician
 Gustav Konstantin von Alvensleben (1879-1965), German-American entrepreneur

References

Former municipalities in Saxony-Anhalt
Nienburg, Saxony-Anhalt